The slender campeloma, scientific name Campeloma decampi, is a species of freshwater snail with an operculum, an aquatic gastropod mollusk in the family Viviparidae.

This species is endemic to Alabama in the United States, where it is known only from Limestone County.

This snail is a federally listed endangered species of the United States.

References

External links 
 http://ecos.fws.gov/speciesProfile/profile/speciesProfile.action?spcode=G098

Viviparidae
Endemic fauna of Alabama
Limestone County, Alabama
Taxonomy articles created by Polbot
ESA endangered species